GELC may refer to

 Curriki (previously known as the Global Education & Learning Community)
 German-speaking Evangelical Lutheran Church in Namibia